"The Black Stone" is a horror short story by American writer Robert E. Howard, first published in the November 1931 issue of Weird Tales.  The story introduces the mad poet Justin Geoffrey and the fictitious Unaussprechlichen Kulten by Friedrich von Junzt. The story is part of the Cthulhu Mythos, and follows the same pattern and has the same features as much of H. P. Lovecraft's classic work.

Synopsis

The story opens with an unnamed narrator being gripped with curiosity by a brief reference to the Black Stone in the book Nameless Cults, aka The Black Book, by Friedrich von Junzt.  He researches the artifact but finds little further information.  The ancient (though its age is debated) monolith stands near to the village of Stregoicavar ("meaning something like Witch-Town") in the mountains of Hungary.  There are many superstitions surrounding it, for instance anyone who sleeps nearby will suffer nightmares for the rest of their life and anyone who visits the stone on Midsummer Night will go insane and die. Though the Monolith is hated and disliked by all in the village, it is said by the Innskeeper that "Any man who lay hammer or maul to it die evilly", so the villagers simply shun the stone.

The narrator decides to travel to Stregoicavar on vacation.   Along the way he hears of the local history and sees the site of an old battlefield, where Count Boris Vladinoff fought the invading Suleiman the Magnificent in 1526.  Local stories say that Vladinoff took shelter in a ruined castle and was brought a lacquered case that had been found near the body of Selim Bahadur, "the famous Turkish scribe and historian", who had died in a recent battle.  The unnamed contents scared the Count but at that moment Turkish artillery destroyed a part of the castle and he got buried in the rubble, where his bones still remain.

Reaching the village, the narrator interviews some of the villagers.  The current inhabitants are not the original people of the village - they were all wiped out by the Turkish invasion in 1526.  They are said to have been of a different, unknown, race than the Hungarians with a reputation for raiding their villages and kidnapping women and children.  A school teacher reveals that according to legend, the original name for the village was Xuthltan and the stone was worshiped by pagans at one time (although they probably did not erect it themselves).  The black stone is "octagonal in shape, some sixteen feet in height and about a foot and a half thick."

A week after arriving the narrator realizes that it is Midsummer Night and makes his way to the stone.  He falls asleep an hour before midnight but wakes to find the chanting and dancing people around the stone. After much dancing, during which the narrator is unable to move or do anything but observe, a baby is killed in sacrifice.  Shortly a giant toad-like monster appears at the top of the stone and a second sacrifice, a young girl, is offered to it.  The narrator faints at this point and decides that it was a dream when he wakes again. But slowly, he realizes that it was no dream. He remembers that Selim Bahadur's case was still with the Count's bones which hadn't been disturbed. The narrator unearths the nobleman's remains and with them, the case belonging to the Turk. He translates the account written by the historian and is horrified by his account of what happened near the Black Stone, how the monstrous creature slaughtered at least ten men before being killed by steel weapons blessed by Muhammad. He realizes that he beheld the cultist worshipers' ghosts bowing before a ghost. He flings the contents of the case into a river.

Characters

Justin Geoffrey
(1898–1926)
A poet who wrote "The People of the Monolith" after visiting the village of Stregoicavar and died "screaming in a madhouse" five years before the events of the story.  He is remembered by the villagers as acting in an odd manner, with a habit of mumbling to himself.  The story opens with this stanza, which is attributed to him:

They say foul things of Old Times still lurk
In dark forgotten corners of the world.
And Gates still gape to loose, on certain nights.
Shapes pent in Hell.

Lovecraft mentions Geoffrey in The Thing on the Doorstep, saying that he is a friend of Edward Derby, the protagonist of the tale. Lovecraft states in the story that Geoffry "died screaming in a madhouse in 1926 after a visit to a sinister, ill-regarded village in Hungary". This is a detail invented by Lovecraft and not part of Howard's original story.

Friedrich Wilhelm von Junzt
(1795–1840)
An eccentric German poet and philosopher noted for his extensive travels and membership in myriad secret societies. He is mainly remembered as the author of the Unaussprechlichen Kulten (Nameless Cults or The Black Book), which was published shortly before his death. Six months after his return from an expedition to Mongolia, he was found dead in a locked and bolted chamber with taloned finger marks on his throat.

Robert M. Price compares the death of Von Junzt to the demise of Abdul Alhazred, author of the Necronomicon: "[In] Lovecraft's tongue-in-cheek 'History of the Necronomicon'...he recounts the doom of Abdul Alhazred. 'He is said by Ebn Khallikan ... to have been seized by an invisible monster in broad daylight and devoured horribly before a large number of fright-frozen witnesses.' ...And 'what of the monstrous hand that strangled out his life?' In both cases, the coroner reports the cause of death as a phantom monster suspiciously like the one that rent Lovecraft himself limb-from-limb in Robert Bloch's 'The Shambler From The Stars'."

At the time of his death, von Junzt was working on a second book, the contents of which are unknown since it was burnt to ashes by his friend, the Frenchman Alexis Ladeau. Having read the book before destroying it, Ladeau afterwards slit his own throat with a razor. Von Junzt was one of the few people to have read the Greek version of the Necronomicon.

Narrator
Almost nothing is known about the story's anonymous narrator. He is very learned, with extensive knowledge of history and anthropology, and has read much on the subject of ancient religion, including obscure or bizarre authors like von Junzt. His tastes in poetry go to the obscure and weird too, such as Geoffrey.

Reception
S. T. Joshi has called the story Howard's only "explicit Cthulhu Mythos story". He goes on to say that the toad-like monster in the story is likely Tsathoggua, the toad god created by Clark Ashton Smith. He cites as evidence the fact that Howard had already referenced Tsathoggua in an earlier tale, "The Children Of The Night".
Robert Weinberg and E. P. Berglund, in their 1973 book The Reader's Guide To The Cthulhu Mythos, stated that "The Black Stone" was "the best Mythos story not written by Lovecraft himself."

References

Sources

External links

 
 Full text at Australian Project Gutenberg

1931 short stories
Cthulhu Mythos short stories
Fantasy short stories
Pulp stories
Short stories by Robert E. Howard
Works originally published in Weird Tales